The Brazeale Homestead is a historic farm complex off Arkansas Highway 128 in rural Dallas County, Arkansas.  The oldest portion of its main house, built c. 1853 by Benjamin Brazeale, is one of only three documented dog trot houses in Dallas County.  The entire complex, consisting of eleven structures, was developed between about 1850 and 1900, and includes the county's only surviving example of a double-crib driveway barn.

The farm complex was listed on the National Register of Historic Places in 1983.

See also
National Register of Historic Places listings in Dallas County, Arkansas

References

Residential buildings completed in 1853
Houses in Dallas County, Arkansas
Historic districts on the National Register of Historic Places in Arkansas
National Register of Historic Places in Dallas County, Arkansas